"The Heart of the Matter" is a song recorded by American rock singer Don Henley from his third solo studio album, The End of the Innocence (1989). Written by Henley, Mike Campbell, and J. D. Souther and produced by Henley, Campbell, and Danny Kortchmar, the song was released as the album's third single, reaching No. 21 on the Billboard Hot 100 and No. 2 on the Mainstream Rock Tracks in early 1990.

The shorter radio edit version omits the "I'm learning to live without you now, but I miss you baby" lyric and skips directly to "I've been trying to get down to the heart of the matter".

In 1994 Henley, along with the Eagles, played an acoustic version of the song at their reunion concert; the performance was omitted from the Hell Freezes Over live CD, but was included in the concert DVD.

The song was covered by American soul singer India.Arie in 2006 on her third studio album, Testimony: Vol. 1, Life & Relationship. Her version of the song is used in the second episode of Brothers & Sisters, entitled "An Act of Will", and in the theatrical trailer for the 2008 film adaptation of Sex and the City. It is also played briefly in a scene of the film.

Stage and television actress Megan Hilty recorded a cover on her 2013 debut solo album It Happens All the Time.

Canadian singer Nikki Yanofsky recorded a live acoustic cover for her 2010 DVD Live in Montreal.

Composition 

In a November 2003 interview with Songfacts, Tom Petty and the Heartbreakers guitarist and songwriter Mike Campbell explained the song's origins:

Personnel 
 Don Henley – lead vocals 
 Mike Campbell – keyboards, guitars 
 Larry Klein – bass 
 Stan Lynch – drums, percussion 
 Carmen Twillie – backing vocals 
 Julia Waters – backing vocals 
 Maxine Waters – backing vocals

Charts

Don Henley version
Weekly charts

Year-end charts

India.Arie version

References

1980s ballads
1989 songs
1990 singles
2006 singles
Don Henley songs
Geffen Records singles
India Arie songs
Motown singles
Rock ballads
Songs written for films
Songs written by Don Henley
Songs written by J. D. Souther
Songs written by Mike Campbell (musician)